Jarl Torske (born 5 June 1949) is a retired Norwegian footballer and manager. His main accolades as a manager are an Olympic gold medal with the Norway women's team in 2000, and four UEFA U19 silver medals with Norway women's U19 team. He has also been assistant manager of Molde FK and Norway.

Career
He hails from Sunndal and spent his playing career in Sunndal, which reached their all-time high level of the second tier in Norwegian football. He amassed 403 games across all competitions. He was also player-manager for Sunndal throughout most of the 1980s, before qualifying as a teacher. He was also a municipal council member in Sunndal for the Socialist Left Party.

Torske did regional work in the Football Association of Norway before being hired as Åge Hareide's assistant manager in Molde FK in 1995. He left after the 1996 season, only to become assistant manager under Per Mathias Høgmo for Norway women's national football team in 1997. They had worked together with the Norwegian boys' under-16 and under-17 national teams. Høgmo and Torske coached Norway to win the 2000 Olympic Games. The next year, Torske became manager of Norway women's national under-19 football team. Staying until 2014, he managed the team to win silver medals at the 2001, 2003, 2008 and 2011 UEFA Women's Under-19 Championships. Several key players during this era came from Torske's native Sunndal, notably Ada Hegerberg, Andrine Hegerberg and Guro Reiten.

In 2014 he was again picked as Per Mathias Høgmo's assistant, this time for the Norway men's national football team. The spell lasted until 2016. He continued as an adviser for young managers in the Football Association of Norway before retiring in 2018. In 2020 he became a developed of youth team coaches in Molde FK.

References

1949 births
Living people
People from Sunndal
Norwegian footballers
Norwegian football managers
Molde FK non-playing staff
Norwegian schoolteachers
Socialist Left Party (Norway) politicians
Møre og Romsdal politicians
Association footballers not categorized by position